SKCC may refer to:

 Shariff Kabunsuan Cultural Complex, a convention center in Cotabato City, Philippines
 St Kilda Cycling Club, an Australian cycling club
 SKCC, the ICAO code for Camilo Daza International Airport, Cúcuta, Colombia